The 2015 GP Ouest-France was a one-day classic cycle race that took place in Plouay on 30 August 2015. The race was the 79th edition of the GP Ouest-France and was the twenty-fourth race of the 2015 UCI World Tour.

The race came down to a bunch sprint of 69 riders. The winner was Alexander Kristoff, who won his twentieth race of the season. Simone Ponzi was second, with Ramūnas Navardauskas third.

Result

References

Bretagne Classic
GP Ouest-France
GP Ouest-France
GP Ouest-France